Ribeauville is a commune in the Aisne department in Hauts-de-France in northern France.

Beekeepers from the area were puzzled when their bees began producing blue honey until it was discovered that a nearby biogas plant processes waste from the manufacturing of M&M's.

Population

Sisters of Divine Providence of Ribeauville
The congregation was founded in 1783 by Father Louis Kremp, vicar at Molsheim in Alsace, and Madelaine Ehrhard to educate young girls, particularly those of rural areas. After the death of Father Kremp, Bruno and Ignace Mertian, two brothers priests of the diocese of Strasbourg, structure and organize the young association.

In 1819, the sisters settled in Ribeauvillé in the former Augustinian convent which became the Mother House of the congregation.  From this date, they are called "the Sisters of the Divine Providence of Ribeauvillé". The statutes are approved by Napoleon 1st in 1807, by the bishop of Strasbourg in 1824 and by Pope Pius IX in 1869. By the end of the 19th century, most of the female youth of Alsace is educated by the sisters, in many public schools in the city as in the countryside.

As of 2019, there are over 400 sisters serving in Europe, Africa, and South America.

See also
Communes of the Aisne department

References

Communes of Aisne
Aisne communes articles needing translation from French Wikipedia